As of June 2018, 12 confirmed impact craters have been found in Finland. They are listed below, sorted by original diameter.

Note 1: The "original" crater dimensions are coarse estimates. Original depths were calculated using the given original diameter using the Impact: Earth! program.

Note 2: "Current solid surface" topography is calculated from the deepest floor (regardless whether it is underwater or on dry land) to highest rim crest; other depth values give the depth of the floor in relation to the original terrain, thus excluding the rim and/or central uplift.

Note 3: Evidence for impact origin for a given structure is often provided in several publications. The year column includes some publications where some evidence of impact origin was provided even though an impact was not necessarily suggested by the authors; somewhere an impact was suggested even though the proof wasn't conclusive; and somewhere definite proof was provided.

General note 1: Crater sizes and shapes vary according to local differences. For example, depending on where you measure the crater diameter the result may vary (craters are seldom perfect circles). This is affected by, e.g., impact angle (low < 5-10 degree impact angles cause more elliptical craters) and local zones of weakness (may cause the crater to become polygonal).

General note 2: On Earth the (theoretical) transition diameter between simple and complex craters is 2 – 4 km. Such small craters may be either end member or some intermediate form, and thus the given dimension estimates may be off. The depth may be off by ~50 %.

References 

 Suomen kraatterit, Finnish impact craters, https://kraatterit.wordpress.com/2015/09/01/perustietoa-montako-kraatteria-suomesta-loytyy/